Three referendums were held in Switzerland during 1897. The first was held on 28 February on a federal law establishing a Central Bank, and was rejected by a majority of voters. The second and third were held on 11 July concerning an amendment to article 24 of the constitution and on legislation on potentially harmful foodstuffs and stimulants. Both were approved by a majority of voters and cantons.

Background
The referendums on the constitutional amendment and the foodstuffs legislation were mandatory referendums, which required a double majority; a majority of the popular vote and majority of the cantons. The decision of each canton was based on the vote in that canton. Full cantons counted as one vote, whilst half cantons counted as half. The Central Bank referendum was an optional referendum, which required only a majority of the public vote.

Results

Central Bank

Amendment to article 24 of the constitution

Legislation on foodstuffs and stimulants

References

1897 referendums
1897 in Switzerland
Referendums in Switzerland